The 1993 Arab Club Champions Cup was played in Tunisia in the city of Tunis. Espérance de Tunis won the championship for the first time beating Al-Muharraq in the final.

Participants

Preliminary round

Final tournament
Final tournament held in Tunis, Tunisia from 9 to 18 February 1993.

Group stage

Group A

Group B

Knockout stage

Semi-finals

Final

Winners

References

External links
8th Arab Club Champions Cup 1993 - rsssf.com

UAFA Club Cup, 1993
UAFA Club Cup, 1993
1993